Mount Kellett is a  mountain on Hong Kong Island, Hong Kong. It was likely named after British Royal Navy Vice Admiral Henry Kellett, the captain of HMS Starling in the 19th century.

A private hospital Matilda Hospital is located at the foot of Mount Kellett.

Historically, apart from houses owned by the government, banks and corporations and lived by their officials and chairmen. The less prestigious streets, such as Guildford Road and Mount Kellett Road, face the southside instead of Victoria Harbour. 

Some of the large houses on the Peak with historic values, including homes of consulates, and government buildings, were demolished over the decades and redeveloped into smaller houses within managed complexes. In 2006, Sun Hung Kai Properties paid HK$ 1.8b, or 42,196 per sq.ft. through a government auction for a plot at 12 Mt Kellett Road, where there were blocks of flats as housing for medium-grade officials. In 2022, a house ‘Twelve Peaks’ at 12 Mt Kellett Road was sold by the creditors of HNA Chairman Chen Feng, whose business in mainland China was bankrupt, for HK$ 390m, or HK$91,959 per sq. ft. Chen Feng paid HK$ 506m in 2016 or HK$ 119,323 per sq.ft.

See also 
 List of mountains, peaks and hills in Hong Kong
 Victoria Peak
 Mount Gough

References 
 
Victoria Peak